Stomiopera is a genus of honeyeaters endemic to Australia. It contains former members of Lichenostomus, and was created after a molecular phylogenetic analysis published in 2011 showed that the original genus was polyphyletic.

The genus contains two species:

The name Stomiopera was first proposed by the German naturalist Ludwig Reichenbach in 1852. The word is derived from the Greek stomion meaning bridlebit or mouth and pēra meaning wallet or pouch.

References

 
Bird genera
Taxa named by Ludwig Reichenbach